Ho'oumi is a town on Nuku Hiva island. It is located along Taioha'e Bay.

References

Populated places in the Marquesas Islands
Nuku Hiva